ThunderRidge High School (TRHS) is a public high school in Highlands Ranch, Colorado. It is part of the Douglas County School District. It was established in 1996 and has approximately 2000 students .

Athletics

ThunderRidge High School opened in 1996 and began varsity athletic competition in the 1998–1999 school year.  TRHS competes at the 5A level in all athletic sports. ThunderRidge has won 20 state championships in various sports. They have an athletic rivalry with Mountain Vista High School.

Basketball

The girls' basketball team has won four state championships. In 2003 both the boys' and girls' teams won the state championship at the Pepsi Center in Denver, Colorado. In 2021 and 2022, the boys' team won the state championship.

Football

The ThunderRidge football competed in 4A football until the 2007 season and now competes in a 5A schedule. They have won three state titles, in 2001, 2004, and 2005.

Baseball

The ThunderRidge baseball team won their first state championship for 5A in 2004. In 2013 the Grizzlies captured their second state championship with a 2–1 victory over Rocky Mountain High School. Thunder Ridge finished as the only undefeated team in the state tournament that year.

Poms

The ThunderRidge poms team won the 5A state championship in 2017.

State Championships

Notable alumni

 Joe Neguse, Representative for Colorado's 2nd congressional district, former University of Colorado Regent
 Matt Bouldin, Israeli Basketball Super League player for the Hapoel Tel Aviv
 Emily Fox, WNBA, played for the Minnesota Lynx
 Jesse Nading, NFL player for the Houston Texans 
 Derek Tolan, PGA player
 Abby Waner, WNBA, played for the New York Liberty

References

External links
 

Public high schools in Colorado
Schools in Douglas County, Colorado
International Baccalaureate schools in Colorado
Educational institutions established in 1996
1996 establishments in Colorado